is a Japanese manga series written and illustrated by Michiteru Kusaba. It has been serialized in Shogakukan's Weekly Shōnen Sunday since April 2017.

Publication
The series began in Shogakukan's Weekly Shōnen Sunday on April 19, 2017. Kusaba stated that Ivan Aivazovsky's The Ninth Wave inspired the series' title and he wanted to make a work that leave the same impression that he got from the painting. Shogakukan has collected its chapters into individual tankōbon volumes. The first volume was released on September 15, 2017. As of November 7, 2022, twenty volumes have been released.

Volume list

See also
Fantasista, another manga series by the same author

References

External links
 

Fishing in anime and manga
Shogakukan manga
Shōnen manga